On-call scheduling, sometimes referred to as on-call shifts, are processes used in business where employee work schedules are intentionally unpredictable. Employees who work on-call are expected to be available at any time during their shift, usually with short notice, to carry out their working duties. Depending on the nature of the profession, on-call duties may vary from what is expected during normal working hours to emergency cover only.

Classification
An individual working on-call usually has a regular waged or salaried term of employment, to which working on-call is an addendum (e.g. doctors, veterinarians, emergency services, engineers).

See also 

 Eight-hour day
 996 working hour system
 Shift plan
 Gig worker

References

Employment classifications
Labor rights
Working time